The 1940 Pittsburgh Steelers season was the team's 8th in the National Football League. It was also the first season in which the team was known as the Pittsburgh Steelers, and not the copycat 
The 1940 team was led by head coach Walt Kiesling in his first full season as the head coach. Kiesling's assistant coaches were Wilbur "Bill" Sortet and Hank Bruder, who both also played.

Offseason
They held training camp at St. Francis College in Loretto, Pennsylvania.
In the 1940 NFL Draft the Steelers continued their pattern of trading away high picks when they dealt their first-round selection (second overall), halfback Kay Eakin from Arkansas, to the New York Giants for tackle Ox Parry, who would never play for the Steelers.

Regular season

Schedule

The Steelers were outscored 178 to 60.

Game Summaries

Week 1 (Sunday September 8, 1940): Chicago Cardinals 

at Forbes Field, Pittsburgh, Pennsylvania
 Game time: 
 Game weather: 
 Game attendance: 22,000
 Referee:
Scoring Drives:
 Pittsburgh – Platukis 45 pass from Patterson (Niccolai kick)
 Chicago Cardinals – Hall 44 pass from Clark (Clark kick)

Week 2 (Sunday, September 15, 1940): New York Giants  

at Forbes Field, Pittsburgh, Pennsylvania
 Game time: 
 Game weather: 
 Game attendance: 18,601
 Referee:
Scoring Drives:
 Pittsburgh – FG Niccolai 48
 Pittsburgh – Tomasetti 26 pass from Patterson (Niccolai kick)
 New York – Shaffer 1 run (Cuff kick)
 New York – FG Barnum 31

Week 3 (Sunday September 22, 1940): Detroit Lions  

at Briggs Stadium, Detroit, Michigan
 Game time: 
 Game weather: 
 Game attendance: 15,310
 Referee:
Scoring Drives:
 Detroit – Cardwell 33 run (White kick)
 Pittsburgh – FG Niccolai 28
 Pittsburgh – Tomasetti 3 run (Niccolai kick)

Week 4 (Sunday September 29, 1940): Brooklyn Dodgers  

at Forbes Field, Pittsburgh, Pennsylvania
 Game time: 
 Game weather: 
 Game attendance: 26,618
 Referee:
Scoring Drives:
 Brooklyn – Manders 1 run (Parker kick)
 Pittsburgh – FG Niccolai 21
 Brooklyn – FG Kercheval 27

Week 5 (Sunday October 6, 1940): Washington Redskins  

at Forbes Field, Pittsburgh, Pennsylvania
 Game time: 
 Game weather: 
 Game attendance: 25,213
 Referee:
Scoring Drives:
 Pittsburgh – FG Niccolai 48
 Washington – Johnston 64 interception (kick failed)
 Washington – Seymour 1 run (Masterson kick)
 Washington – Millner 30 pass from Filchock (Russell kick)
 Washington – Johnston 1 run (Masterson kick)
 Washington – Johnston 2 run (Sanford kick)
 Pittsburgh – Condit pass from Thompson (Niccolai kick)
 Washington – Seymour 10 run (kick failed)

Week 6 (Sunday October 13, 1940): Brooklyn Dodgers  

at Ebbets Field, Brooklyn, New York
 Game time: 
 Game weather: 
 Game attendance: 19,468
 Referee:
Scoring Drives:
 Brooklyn – Manders 2 run (Parker kick)
 Brooklyn – Schwartz – 7 pass from Parker (Parker kick)
 Brooklyn – Leckonby 8 pass from Kercheval (Kercheval kick)

Week 7 (Sunday October 20, 1940): New York Giants  

at Polo Grounds, New York, New York
 Game time: 
 Game weather: 
 Game attendance: 19,798
 Referee:
Scoring Drives:
 New York – Cuff 60 pass from Miller (Cuff kick)
 New York – FG Cuff 23
 New York – Safety, Pirro tackled in end zone

Week 8 (Sunday October 27, 1940): Green Bay Packers  

at Wisconsin State Fair Park, Milwaukee, Wisconsin
 Game time: 
 Game weather: 
 Game attendance: 13,703
 Referee:
Scoring Drives:
 Green Bay – Adkins 35 interception (Engebretsen kick)
 Pittsburgh – FG Niccolai 36
 Green Bay – FG Hinkle 33
 Green Bay – Balazs 2 run (Hutson kick)
 Green Bay – Hutson 19 pass from Van Every (Engebretsen kick)

Week 9 (Sunday November 3, 1940): Washington Redskins  

at Griffith Stadium, Washington, DC
 Game time: 
 Game weather: 
 Game attendance: 31,204
 Referee:
Scoring Drives:
 Pittsburgh – FG Niccolai 25
 Washington – Johnston 39 pass from Baugh (kick failed)
 Washington – Filchock 12 run (Russell kick)
 Pittsburgh – Platukis 31 pass from Patterson (Niccolai kick)
 Washington – Johnston 45 pass from Baugh (Masterson kick)
 Washington – Masterson 15 pass from Filchock (Russell kick)
 Washington – Todd 1 run (Russell kick)
 Washington – FG Masterson 20

Week 10 (Sunday November 10, 1940): Philadelphia Eagles  

at Forbes Field, Pittsburgh, Pennsylvania
 Game time: 
 Game weather: 
 Game attendance: 9,556
 Referee:
Scoring Drives:
 Philadelphia – FG Sommers 36
 Pittsburgh – McDonough 1 run (Niccolai kick)
The Steelers defeated the Eagles 7–0.

Week 13 (Thursday November 28, 1940): Philadelphia Eagles  

at Shibe Park, Philadelphia, Pennsylvania
 Game time: 
 Game weather: 
 Game attendance: 4,200
 Referee:
Scoring Drives:
 Philadelphia – Riffle 17 run (Somers kick)

Standings

References

Pittsburgh Steelers seasons
Pittsburgh Steelers
Pittsburg Pir